Daryl Baldwin is an American academic and linguist who specializes in the Myaamia language. An enrolled member of the Miami Tribe of Oklahoma, Baldwin has served as a member of the cultural resource advisory committee of the Miami Tribe.

Education 
Baldwin received a Bachelor of Science and a Master of Arts in Native American linguistics from the University of Montana.

Career 
Baldwin is the director of the Myaamia Center at Miami University in Oxford, Ohio. The center works to revitalize endangered languages. His devotion to the work of language revitalization led to the creation of the Myaamia Center at Miami University and his appointment as the director and was chosen in 2016 as a MacArthur Foundation Fellow. Baldwin seeks to revitalize languages for the people of the community, language and cultural revitalization.

After reading a draft of David Costa's thesis on the Miami-Illinois language, Baldwin realized he would need training in linguistics to not only understand Costa's work but also work to revitalize his own language and to teach it to others. The realization led Baldwin to apply for a graduate degree at the University of Montana. Since 1996, Baldwin began to teach himself and his family and four children the Miami language. Baldwin also learned through studies held by the Smithsonian's National Anthropological Archives.

Linguistic work 
Baldwin works with Myaamia people developing culture and language-based educational materials and programs for the community. Baldwin has taught and raised his four children as native speakers of Myaamia and continues to teach others as assistant educational leadership professor.

Much of Baldwin's work has been collaborative, contributing to edited collections and journal articles, and he also works with other linguists such as Leanne Hinton's National Breath of Life project, a two-week biennial gathering of linguists sharing, finding and utilizing linguistic archival sources.

Publications

Books 
 Baldwin, Daryl and Costa, David. 2005. myaamia neehi peewaalia kaloosioni mahsinaakani: A Miami-Peoria Dictionary. Miami Tribe of Oklahoma.

Edited volumes 
 Baldwin, Daryl, George Ironstrack. 2015. “Mihšihkinaahkwa (Little Turtle)”. In Indiana’s 200: The People Who Shaped The Hoosier State. Edited by Linda C. Gugin and James E. St. Clair. Indiana Historical Society Press, Indianapolis.
 Baldwin, Daryl. 2014.  “oowaaha myaamiaataweenki: Miami Is Spoken Here.” In Handbook of Heritage, Community, and Native American Languages in The United States. Edited by Terrence G. Wiley, Joy Kreeft Peyton, Donna Christian, Sarah Catherine K. Moore, Na Liu. Routledge – Taylor & Francis Group, New York and London.
 Baldwin, Daryl, Karen Baldwin, Jessie Baldwin, Jarrid Baldwin. 2013. Myaamiaataweenki oowaaha: Miami Spoken Here. In: Bringing our Languages Home: Language Revitalization for Families, Leanne Hinton (ed.), Heyday Books, Berkeley,  CA.
 Warner, S. Mark and Baldwin, Daryl. 2004. Building Ties: The Collaboration between the Miami Nation and Archaeology. In: Places In Mind: Public Archaeology as Applied Anthropology, Shackel, A., Paul, Chambers, J., Erve, (ed.), Routledge, New York and London.

Journal articles 
 Whalen D.H., Moss M. and Baldwin D. "Healing through language: Positive physical health effects of indigenous language use." F1000Research 2016, 5: 852. (doi:10.12688/f1000research.8656.1)
 Mosley-Howard, G. Susan, Daryl Baldwin, George Ironstrack, Kate Rousmaniere, Bobbe Burke. 2016. "Niila Myaamia (I Am Miami): Identity and Retention of Miami Tribe College Students," In Journal of College Student Retention: Research, Theory & Practice. 17 no. 4 (February 2016): 437–61. Sage Publication, Inc. (Journal of College Student Retention- Research, Theory & Practice-2016-Mosley-Howard-437-61 2)
 McCarty, Teresa L., Daryl Baldwin, George M. Ironstrack, Julie Olds. 2013. "neetawaapantamaanki iilinwiaanki meehkamaanki niiyoonaani: Searching for Our Talk and Finding Ourselves." In Language Planning and Policy in Native America: History, Theory, Praxis. Teresa L. McCarty, Multilingual Matters, Bristol, Buffalo, Toronto.
 Baldwin, Daryl and Olds, Julie. 2007. "Miami Indian Language and Cultural Research at Miami University." In Beyond Red Power: New Perspectives on American Indian Politics and Activism. Cobb, M, Daniel and Fowler, Loretta (ed.), Santa Fe: School of American Research Press.
 Baldwin, Daryl. 2002. "Mihšihkinaahkwa: maamiikaahkia akima." Northwest Ohio Quarterly 74, no. 1: 22–28.

Lecture 
 Baldwin, Daryl. 2003. Miami language reclamation: from Ground Zero. A lecture presented by the Center for Writing and the Interdisciplinary Minor in Literacy and Rhetorical Studies. Speaker Series No. 24. University of Minnesota: Center for Writing.

References

External links 

Miami language camp, with Daryl Baldwin
Myaamia Center, official site

Miami University people
Miami people
University of Montana alumni
Native American language revitalization
Native American linguists
MacArthur Fellows
Linguists from the United States
20th-century linguists
21st-century linguists
Year of birth missing (living people)
Living people
Place of birth missing (living people)